is a bank based in Amagasaki, in Hyogo Prefecture, Japan. It was founded in 1921. , the bank has 94 branches in Osaka and Hyogo Prefectures.

See also
List of banks
List of banks in Japan

References

External links
  

Regional banks of Japan
Amagasaki
Japanese companies established in 1921
Companies based in Hyōgo Prefecture
Banks established in 1921